The following are notable people who were either born/raised or have lived for a significant period of time in the Lexington, Kentucky, metropolitan area:

See also
 List of University of Kentucky alumni
 List of people from Kentucky
 List of people from the Louisville metropolitan area

References

 
Lexington, Kentucky
Lexington